Pannaxiakos Athlitikos Omilos (Pannaxian Athletic Union), commonly referred to as Pannaxiakos , is a Greek sports club based in Naxos.

History 
The club was founded in 1960 in Naxos.

Crest and Colours
Since the club's foundation, the colors are blue and white referring to the sea. The emblem of the Association is the "trademark" of the town of Naxos, the gate of the ancient temple of Apollo on the northwestern edge of the harbor, the famous "Portara".

Departments
The club fields teams in many sports, including athletics and association football.

Titles

Pannaxiakos F.C.
Cyclades Champions (4):
 1983, 1993, 2003, 2011

Cyclades Cup (6):
 1987, 1993, 2004, 2007, 2011, 2012

Pannaxiakos Athletics

Former departments 
In the past, the club had departments in basketball and volleyball, when merged in 2006 with A.O. Naxos 2004 and make the club Pannaxiakos A.O.N.

Titles

Pannaxiakos B.C.

Pannaxiakos V.C.

 A2 (1) :
 2013
 Greek Women's Volleyball Cup Finalist (1) :
 2014

References

External links
pannaxiakosfc.blogspot.gr
sportcyclades.gr
Πανναξιακός ΑΟ
pannaxiakos-athensclub.gr

Multi-sport clubs in Greece
Naxos